Maksim Buculjević (born 20 September 1991) is a Serbian male volleyball player. He is part of the Serbia men's national volleyball team. He competed at the 2015 European Games in Baku. On club level he plays for Hurrikaani Loimaa.

See also
Serbia at the 2015 European Games

References

1991 births
Living people
Serbian men's volleyball players
Volleyball players at the 2015 European Games
European Games competitors for Serbia
Sportspeople from Novi Sad
Serbian expatriate sportspeople in Slovenia
Expatriate volleyball players in Slovenia
Serbian expatriate sportspeople in Finland
Expatriate volleyball players in Finland